5F-CUMYL-PINACA (also known as SGT-25 and sometimes sold in e-cigarette form as C-Liquid) is an indazole-3-carboxamide based synthetic cannabinoid. 5F-CUMYL-PINACA acts as a potent agonist for the cannabinoid receptors, with the original patent claiming approximately 4x selectivity for CB1, having an EC50 of <0.1 nM for human CB1 receptors and 0.37 nM for human CB2 receptors. In more recent assays using different techniques, 5F-CUMYL-PINACA was variously found to have an EC50 of 0.43 nM at CB1 and 11.3 nM at CB2, suggesting a somewhat higher CB1 selectivity of 26 times, or alternatively 15.1 nM at CB1 and 34.8 nM at CB2 with only 2.3 times selectivity, however these figures cannot be directly compared due to the different assay techniques used in each case.

Legal status 
In the United States, 5F-CUMYL-PINACA was temporarily emergency scheduled by the DEA in 2019. and made a permanent Schedule I Controlled Substance on April 7, 2022.
Sweden's public health agency suggested classifying 5F-CUMYL-PINACA as a hazardous substance on November 10, 2014.

See also 
 5F-SDB-006
 CUMYL-4CN-BINACA
 CUMYL-PICA
 CUMYL-PINACA
 CUMYL-THPINACA
 SDB-006
 NNE1

References 

Cannabinoids
Designer drugs
Indazolecarboxamides
Organofluorides